Brent George Laing (born December 10, 1978) is a Canadian curler from Horseshoe Valley, Ontario. He currently plays lead for Mike McEwen. He grew up in Meaford, Ontario.

Career
Curling out of the Ottawa Curling Club (in Ottawa) and later the Stayner Curling Club (in Stayner, Ontario), Laing played lead for John Morris until Morris left for Alberta in 2003. With Morris, Laing won the 1998 and 1999 Canadian Junior Curling Championships as well as the 1998 and 1999 World Junior Curling Championships. The team played in the 2001 Canadian Olympic Curling Trials, but missed the playoffs after finishing with a 5-4 record. In 2002, they made it all the way to the Brier final, losing to Alberta's Randy Ferbey.

In 2004, Laing joined the Glenn Howard rink, playing second for the team. The team played in the 2005 Canadian Olympic Curling Trials, but missed the playoffs, finishing with a 5-4 record. Later that season, they lost in the final of the 2006 Tim Hortons Brier to Jean-Michel Ménard from Quebec. The following year, they won the 2007 Tim Hortons Brier (defeating Newfoundland and Labrador's Brad Gushue rink in the final) and then the 2007 Ford World Men's Curling Championship, where they defeated Germany's Andy Kapp rink in the final. The team lost in the 2008 Tim Hortons Brier final to Kevin Martin of Alberta, and at the 2009 Tim Hortons Brier, they lost in the semifinal Jeff Stoughton's Manitoba rink. The next season, the team would make it all the way to the finals of the 2009 Canadian Olympic Curling Trials, where they lost to Kevin Martin. At the 2010 Tim Hortons Brier, the team lost in the final once again, this time to Kevin Koe of Alberta. The team lost their second straight Brier final in 2011, losing to Stoughton again. The team won the 2012 Tim Hortons Brier, defeating Koe in the final. The team won the 2012 World Men's Curling Championship as Team Canada, claiming the gold medal, after defeating Scotland's Tom Brewster in the final. The team won the bronze medal at the 2013 Tim Hortons Brier, defeating Brad Gushue of Newfoundland and Labrador in the bronze medal game. The team played in the 2013 Canadian Olympic Curling Trials, but missed the playoffs, finishing with a 2-5 record. The team did make it to the 2014 Brier, losing in the Ontario final to Greg Balsdon. At the end of the season, Laing left the rink to join Koe's Alberta team as his second.

The new Koe team represented Alberta at the 2015 Tim Hortons Brier, but missed the playoffs, going 6-5 in the round robin. The team had more success at the 2016 Tim Hortons Brier, which they won, by defeating Newfoundland and Labrador (Gushue) in the final. The team represented Canada at the 2016 World Men's Curling Championship, where they won the gold medal, defeating Denrmark's Rasmus Stjerne in the final. The team represented Team Canada at the 2017 Tim Hortons Brier, but lost to Gushue in the final in a re-match of the previous Brier. The following season, the team won the 2017 Canadian Olympic Curling Trials, and represented Canada at the 2018 Winter Olympics, but fell short of the podium after losing in the bronze medal game to Switzerland's Peter de Cruz rink. Later that season, it was announced that Laing would return to playing out of his home province of Ontario, and would join the John Epping rink as his second. In his first season as a member of the Epping rink, the team lost in the 2019 Tim Hortons Brier Wild Card game.

Ryan Fry joined the Epping team at third for the 2019–20 season, with Camm and Laing moving to second and lead and Savill leaving the team. They had a strong start to the year, winning both the Stu Sells Oakville Tankard and the 2019 AMJ Campbell Shorty Jenkins Classic. They had a semifinal finish at the Masters, the first Grand Slam of the season. They missed the playoffs at the next two slams, the Tour Challenge and the National after going 1–3 at both. Team Epping posted a 6–2 record en route to winning the 2019 Canada Cup in Leduc, Alberta. This win qualified them to represent Team Canada along with five other Canadian teams at the 2020 Continental Cup where they lost 22.5–37.5 to the Europeans. They had a strong showing at the Canadian Open where they made it all the way to the final where they lost to the Brad Jacobs rink. At the 2020 Ontario Tankard, they completed their undefeated run throughout the week with an 8–3 win over Glenn Howard. Representing Ontario at the 2020 Tim Hortons Brier, they finished the championship pool with a 7–4 record and in a four way tie for fourth place. They defeated Team Wild Card (Mike McEwen) in the first tiebreaker before losing to Northern Ontario (Brad Jacobs) in the second and being eliminated from contention. It would be the team's last event of the season as both the Players' Championship and the Champions Cup Grand Slam events were cancelled due to the COVID-19 pandemic.

Team Epping began the 2020–21 season with a win at the 2020 Stu Sells Toronto Tankard. The 2021 Ontario provincial playdowns were cancelled due to the COVID-19 pandemic in Ontario. As the 2020 provincial champions, Team Epping was chosen to represent Ontario at the 2021 Tim Hortons Brier in Calgary. At the Brier, they finished with a 7–5 record.

On the World Curling Tour, Laing has won a career 16 Grand Slams, 13 with the Howard rink. He won the 2015 GSOC Tour Challenge and the 2018 Players' Championship with Koe, and the 2018 Masters with Epping.

Personal life
Laing is married to another champion curler, Jennifer Jones from Manitoba. They have two children together, Isabella and Skyla. Laing also has a child from a previous relationship. Laing currently works as an entrepreneur for World Financial Group.

Teams

References

External links

1978 births
Living people
Curlers from Ontario
Curlers from Calgary
Sportspeople from Simcoe County
World curling champions
People from Grey County
Brier champions
Canadian male curlers
Continental Cup of Curling participants
Curlers at the 2018 Winter Olympics
Olympic curlers of Canada
Canada Cup (curling) participants